Indian Pond is a  shallow, infertile, warm-water pond in Kingston and Plympton, Massachusetts, west of Route 80 and north of the new U.S. Route 44 highway. The average depth of the pond is three feet. Access to the pond is off Indian Road in Plympton. Fishing is regarded as generally poor due to the acidity of the water and the pond's natural infertility.

External links
MassWildlife - Pond Maps

Ponds of Plymouth County, Massachusetts
Ponds of Massachusetts